Sigrid Chatel (born 26 April 1940) is a Canadian fencer. She competed in the women's individual foil event at the 1968 Summer Olympics.

References

1940 births
Living people
Canadian female fencers
Olympic fencers of Canada
Fencers at the 1968 Summer Olympics
Sportspeople from Frankfurt
German emigrants to Canada
Pan American Games medalists in fencing
Pan American Games bronze medalists for Canada
Fencers at the 1967 Pan American Games
Fencers at the 1970 British Commonwealth Games
Commonwealth Games competitors for Canada